Eugene Wesley Ely is an American physician specialized in critical care and pulmonary medicine. He is a professor of medicine at the school of medicine of Vanderbilt University in Nashville, Tennessee.

According to Scopus, his h-index in late 2022 was 110.

References 

Vanderbilt University faculty
Year of birth missing (living people)
Living people